Janice Rankin MBE (born 8 February 1972 as Janice Watt) is a Scottish curler and Olympic champion. She received a gold medal at the 2002 Winter Olympics in Salt Lake City, with team mates Rhona Martin (skip), Deborah Knox, Fiona MacDonald and Margaret Morton.

She had been a pupil at The Mary Erskine School in Edinburgh.

References

External links
 

1972 births
Living people
Scottish female curlers
British female curlers
Olympic gold medallists for Great Britain
Olympic curlers of Great Britain
Olympic medalists in curling
Curlers at the 2002 Winter Olympics
Medalists at the 2002 Winter Olympics
Scottish Olympic medallists
People educated at the Mary Erskine School
Continental Cup of Curling participants
Members of the Order of the British Empire